The Tidewater Sharks were a minor league professional ice hockey team, based in Norfolk, Virginia, and members of the Southern Hockey League from 1975 to 1977. The Sharks played home games at the Norfolk Scope, and shared the Hampton Roads area with the Hampton Gulls. The ownership group led by Dick Davis, also operated the Tidewater Tides baseball team. The Sharks ceased operations in January on 1977, during the second season of play.

History
In the 1975–76 season, Tidewater was affiliated with the Cleveland Crusaders, and the Buffalo Sabres. John Hanna was named the team's first coach, and the Sharks featured Scotland-born top scorer Bill Steele, but finished in fifth-place finish, and missed the playoffs.

In the 1976–77 season, Tidewater was affiliated with the Calgary Cowboys. Harold Schooley took over the coaching duties, and the team was in second place by early 1977. On January 7, the Tidewater Sharks folded after missing payroll, and the players refused to continue.

Notable players
Notable Sharks players that also played in the National Hockey League or World Hockey Association:

Ron Anderson
Yves Archambault
Ron Ashton
Butch Barber
Michel Boudreau
Randy Burchell
Andre Deschamps
Dave Given
Bruce Greig
Derek Haas
Derek Harker
Steve Hull
Larry Israelson
Mike Jakubo
Rick Jodzio
Ric Jordan
Joe Junkin
Dave Kryskow
Rick Lalonde
Camille LaPierre
Doug Lindskog
Bernie Lukowich
Jim Mayer
Peter McNamee
Eddie Mio
George Pesut
Tom Serviss
Claude St. Sauveur
Bill Steele
Jean Tetreault
Jim Watt

Results
Season-by-season results:

References

1975 establishments in Virginia
1977 disestablishments in Virginia
Buffalo Sabres minor league affiliates
Calgary Cowboys minor league affiliates
Cleveland Crusaders minor league affiliates
Ice hockey clubs established in 1975
Ice hockey clubs disestablished in 1977
Ice hockey teams in Virginia
Southern Hockey League (1973–1977) teams
Sports in Norfolk, Virginia